Chrysochroinae is a subfamily of beetles in the family Buprestidae: the "jewel beetles".

Tribes and Genera
The following genera are included:

Chrysochroini

Auth.: Laporte de Castelnau, 1835; synonyms: Chalcophorellini Tôyama, 1986, Chalcophorini Lacordaire, 1857, Iridotaenini Tôyama, 1987
subtribe Chalcophorina Lacordaire, 1857
 Afrochroa Holynski, 2001
 Afrophorella Obenberger, 1942
 Austrochalcophora Bellamy, 2006
 Austrophorella Kerremans, 1903
 Bellamyclus Odzikmen, 2008
 Bojaskinskia Deyrolle, 2009
 Chalcophora Dejean, 1833
 Chalcophorella Kerremans, 1903
 Chalcophoropsis Saunders, 1871
 Chalcophorotaenia Obenberger, 1928
 Chlorophorella Descarpentries, 1973
 Chrysodema Laporte & Gory, 1835
 Cyphogastra Deyrolle, 1864
 Cyphogastrella Théry, 1926
 Iridotaenia Deyrolle, 1864
 Madecassia Kerremans, 1903
 Metataenia Thery, 1923
 Nipponobuprestis Obenberger, 1942
 Papuodema Obenberger, 1928
 Paracupta Deyrolle, 1864
 Parataenia Kerremans, 1892
 Periorisma Deyrolle, 1864
 Pseudotaenia Kerremans, 1903
 Rhabdolona Obenberger, 1924
 Rooniella Théry, 1935
 Sapaia Bílý, 1994
 Scaptelytra Saunders, 1871
 Tamamushia Miwa & Chûjô, 1935
 Texania Casey, 1909

subtribe Chrysochroina Laporte, 1835
 Asamia Thery, 1909
 Chrysochroa Dejean, 1833
 Demochroa White, 1859
 Pseudocallopistus Obenberger, 1942
 Semenoviella Obenberger, 1924
subtribe Eucallopistina Bellamy, 2003
 Asemochrysus Deyrolle, 1864
 Chrysaspis Saunders, 1869
 Chrysopistus Thery, 1923
 Cyalithus Thomson, 1878
 Epidelus Deyrolle, 1864
 Eucallopistus Bellamy, 2003
 Eucallopistus Bellamy, 2003
 Kolleria Théry, 1925
 Micropistus Théry, 1925
 Philocteanus Deyrolle, 1864
 Pygichaeta Obenberger, 1920
 Steraspis Dejean, 1833

Dicercini

Auth.: Gistel, 1848
subtribe Dicercina Gistel, 1848
 Achardella Obenberger, 1926
 Apateum Spinola, 1837
 Archepsila Holynski, 2001
 Capnodis Eschscholtz, 1829
 Chalcopoecila Saunders, 1871
 Cyphosoma Mannerheim, 1837
 Dicerca Eschscholtz, 1829
 Dicercomorpha Deyrolle, 1864
 (incomplete)
subtribe Haplotrinchina Holyński, 1993
 Cardiaspis Saunders, 1866
 Haplotrinchus Kerremans, 1903
 Pseudhyperantha Saunders, 1869
subtribe Hippomelanina Holyński, 1993
 Barrellus Nelson & Bellamy, 1996
 Gyascutus LeConte, 1858
 Hippomelas Laporte & Gory, 1837
 Prasinalia Casey, 1909
subtribe Pseudoperotina Tôyama, 1987
 Asidoptera Obenberger, 1923
 Pseudoperotis Obenberger, 1936

Other tribes
 Evidini – Paraleptodemini – Paratassini – Phrixiini – Poecilonotini – Sphenopterini – Vadonaxiini
Genera:

 Agelia Laporte & Gory, 1835
 Ampheremus Fall, 1917
 Armenosoma Waterhouse, 1887
 Baudonisia Cobos, 1963
 Catoxantha Dejean, 1833
 Chalcoplia Saunders, 1871
 Chrysesthes Dejean, 1833
 Cinyra Laporte & Gory, 1837
 Cordillerita Obenberger, 1926
 Demochroa White, 1859
 Descarpentriesiola Cobos, 1978
 Ectinogonia Spinola, 1837
 Embrikilium Obenberger, 1936
 Euchroma Dejean, 1833
 Euplectalecia Obenberger, 1924
 Eupodalecia Obenberger, 1958
 Evides Dejean, 1833
 Fahraeusia Obenberger, 1936
 Genestia Thery, 1923
 Halecia Laporte & Gory, 1837
 Holynskirbus Ozdikmen, 2008
 Hypoprasis Fairmaire & Germain, 1864
 Icarina Alluaud, 1896
 Lampetis Dejean, 1833
 Lamprodila Motschulsky, 1860
 Latipalpis Solier, 1833
 Megaloxantha Kerremans, 1902
 Melobasina Kerremans, 1900
 Monosacra Thomson, 1878
 Nanularia Casey, 1909
 Nesotrinchus Obenberger, 1924
 Oedisterna Lacordaire, 1857
 Paratassa Marseul, 1882
 Pelecopselaphus Solier, 1833
 Perotis Dejean, 1833
 Phelix Marseul, 1865
 Poecilonota Eschscholtz, 1829
 Polybothris Spinola, 1837
 Pseudalecia Thery, 1923
 Pseudolampetis Obenberger, 1926
 Psiloptera Dejean, 1833
 Saundersina Cobos, 1978
 Sphenoptera Dejean, 1833
 Strandissa Obenberger, 1936
 Tokaranodicera Hattori, 2004
 Touzalinia Thery, 1923
 Ulaikoilia Bily & Kuban, 2009
 Vadonaxia Descarpentries, 1969
 Westcottia Bellamy, 1997
 Zoolrecordia Holynski, 2006

References

External links

Polyphaga subfamilies